This article presents a list of the historical events and publications of Australian literature during 1903.

Books 
 Louis Becke – Helen Adair
 Randolph Bedford – True Eyes and the Whirlwind
 Guy Boothby
 Connie Burt
 The Countess Londa
 The League of the Twelve
 A Two-Fold Inheritance
 Joseph Furphy – Such Is Life
 E.W. Hornung – Denis Dent
 Rosa Praed
 Fugitive Anne: A Romance of the Unexplored Bush
 The Ghost

Short stories 
 Steele Rudd – Our New Selection
 Ethel Turner – Betty and Co

Poetry 

 C. J. Dennis – "'Urry!"
 George Essex Evans – "The Wayfarers"
 Mary Gilmore – "Marri'd"
 Henry Kendall – Poems of Henry Clarence Kendall
 Henry Lawson
 "A Voice from the City"
 "The Wander-Light"
 Louisa Lawson
 "The Digger's Daughter"
 "The Hour is Come"
 "A Reverie"
 Breaker Morant – "When Stock Go By"
 Bernard O'Dowd – Dawnward?
 Will H. Ogilvie – Hearts of Gold and Other Verses
 A.B. Paterson
 "The Riders in the Stand"
 "Saltbush Bill on the Patriarchs"

Biography 
 Ada Cambridge – Thirty Years in Australia

Births 

A list, ordered by date of birth (and, if the date is either unspecified or repeated, ordered alphabetically by surname) of births in 1903 of Australian literary figures, authors of written works or literature-related individuals follows, including year of death.

 3 April – Paul McGuire, diplomat and novelist (died 1978)
 22 July – Betty Roland, journalist and writer for children (died 1996)
 24 September – Lennie Lower, writer (died 1947)
 15 October – Pixie O'Harris, poet and writer for children (died 1991)
 29 October – Olive Pell, librarian and dramatist (died 2002)
Unknown date

 Lyndall Hadow – short story writer and journalist (died 1976)

Deaths 

A list, ordered by date of death (and, if the date is either unspecified or repeated, ordered alphabetically by surname) of deaths in 1903 of Australian literary figures, authors of written works or literature-related individuals follows, including year of birth.

 12 March – Leontine Cooper, essayist and short story writer (born 1837)
16 March – Aeneas J. Gunn, pastoralist and writer (born 1862)
 15 August – William Barak, writer (born ca. 1824)

See also 
 1903 in poetry
 List of years in literature
 List of years in Australian literature
 1903 in literature
 1902 in Australian literature
 1903 in Australia
 1904 in Australian literature

References

Literature
Australian literature by year
20th-century Australian literature